Lin County or Linxian is a county in the west of Shanxi province, China, bordering Shaanxi province to the west. It is under the administration of Lüliang city.

Climate

References

External links
www.xzqh.org 

County-level divisions of Shanxi